Harry Wilson Barnes (August 19, 1915 – December 3, 1993), nicknamed "Mooch", was an American Negro league catcher in the 1930s and 1940s.

A native of Highland Home, Alabama, Barnes made his major league debut with the Birmingham Black Barons in 1937, and went on to play for the Atlanta Black Crackers and Memphis Red Sox. He died in Birmingham, Alabama in 1993 at age 78.

References

External links
 and Baseball-Reference Black Baseball Stats and Seamheads 
 Harry 'Mooch' Barnes at Negro League Baseball Players Association

1915 births
1993 deaths
Atlanta Black Crackers players
Birmingham Black Barons players
Memphis Red Sox players
20th-century African-American sportspeople
Baseball catchers